The Tanalyk (Tanalıq), is a river in Bashkortostan and Orenburg Oblast in Russia, a right tributary of the Ural. The Tanalyk freezes up in the second half of October through November and remains icebound until April. The town of Baymak is along the Tanalyk.

References 

Rivers of Bashkortostan
Rivers of Orenburg Oblast
Ural basin